Qaleh Qafeh (also Romanized as Qal’eh Qafeh) is a village in Qaleh Qafeh Rural District, in the Central District of Minudasht County, Golestan Province, Iran. At the 2006 census, its population was 1,326, in 317 families.

References 

Populated places in Minudasht County